The 2007 America East men's basketball tournament was held from March 2–4 at Agganis Arena. The final was held March 10 at Patrick Gym. The Albany Great Danes won the tournament to advance to their second consecutive berth in the NCAA tournament. Albany was given the 13th seed in the South Regional of the NCAA Tournament and lost in the first round to Virginia 84–57. Vermont gained a bid to the NIT and lost in the first round to Kansas State 59–57.

Bracket and Results

See also
America East Conference

References

America East Conference men's basketball tournament
2006–07 America East Conference men's basketball season
2007 in sports in Vermont
Sports competitions in Burlington, Vermont
College basketball tournaments in Vermont